Nima Fakhrara aka Nima Fahrara, (born Amir Nima Fkhrara;  12 November 1983 in Tehran, Iran) is an Iranian film composer. He is based in Los Angeles.

Filmography (Composer)

References

External links
 Official website
 

1983 births
Living people
Musicians from Tehran
Iranian film score composers